Augšdaugavas NSS, previous Ilūkstes NSS, is a Latvian football club located in Ilūkste. The club played its home matches at the Ilūkstes pilsētas stadions with capacity of 300 people.

History
The club was founded in 1988 as Zemgale Ilūkste. It took part in the Latvian SSR Higher League, finishing 13th in its debut season. In 1989, just one year after foundation, the club's name was changed to Vārpa Ilūkste, and they finished the league in the 14th position. The 1990 season saw Vārpa Ilūkste achieve its best result until then – the 10th position in the league table. In 1991 the club's name was changed to Vārpa Dilar, but in 1992 simply Dilar was left. In 1991 they finished the league in the 7th position, but after the collapse of the Soviet Union earned a place in the newly formed Latvian Higher League for the 1992 season. With just 2 points in 22 matches the club finished the league in the last 12th position of the table and was relegated to the Latvian First League. In 1993 they were not enrolled as participants and the club's existence had practically ended.

In 1997, after 4 years of silence, the team was reformed as FK Ilūkste and took part in the Latvian First League, finishing in the 9th position. In 1998 the club's name was once again changed – this time to Ceļinieks – as the club managed to grab the 4th position of the league table at the end of the championship. The next season saw them get relegated from the Latvian First League, as they finished in the 7th position, receding to the Latvian Second League. The club played in the 3rd tier of Latvian football until 2006, when they won the championship and were once again promoted to the Latvian First League. Before the start of the 2007 Latvian First League season the club was renamed Ilūkste/BJSS. The club withdrew from the championship in mid-season due to financial difficulties, and they were once again relegated to the Latvian Second League. In 2009 and 2010 they won the Latvian Second League, but lost in the promotion play-offs, failing to earn a promotion. The promotion to the Latvian First League came in 2011, when Ilūkste/BJSS once again won the league and the play-offs as well.

In 2012 the club's name was changed to Ilūkstes NSS, as the club started its cooperation with the Sports school of the Ilūkste municipality. They finished the Latvian First League championship in the 2nd position, being promoted to the Latvian Higher League for the second time in the club's history. In 2013 Ilūkstes NSS became members of the Latvian Higher League. They started the season playing their home matches in Daugavpils due to the reconstruction of the Ilūkstes pilsētas stadions. The stadium was opened in June 2013, and since then it has been the club's home ground.

Several Latvian football players, who started their professional careers in Ilūkste, have made it to the national team, including Aleksandrs Jeļisejevs, Andris Vaņins, Jurijs Žigajevs and Ritus Krjauklis.

Honours
 Latvian Second League winners
 2011
 Latvian Second League runners-up
 2006, 2009, 2010
 Latvian First League runners-up
 2012

Managers

League and Cup history

Key:* Results before promotion play-offs (Latgale's championship zone)

Sponsors

References

External links
  Official website
  Official Latvian Football Federation website

 
Sport in Ilūkste
Football clubs in Latvia
Association football clubs established in 1988
1988 establishments in Latvia